The Saratoga International Theater Institute (also known as SITI) was an ensemble-based theater company based in New York City and Saratoga Springs, New York.  SITI was founded in 1992 by American director Anne Bogart and Japanese director Tadashi Suzuki on the campus of Skidmore College to redefine and revitalize contemporary theater in the United States. Originally envisioned as a summer institute in Saratoga Springs, New York, SITI has expanded to encompass a year-round program based in New York City, with a summer season in Saratoga. The company believed that contemporary American theater must incorporate artists from around the world and learn from a cross-cultural exchange of dance, music, art, and performance experiences.

SITI is noted for combining the Viewpoints process of Anne Bogart with the Suzuki Method of Actor Training of Tadashi Suzuki. Both techniques are alternatives to the Stanislavski-based Method training which has dominated American stage and screen for generations. Over their history, the company produced more than forty shows.

In October 2020, SITI announced they would stop producing shows in 2022, although classes would continue. Its final performances were of A Christmas Carol at Bard College.

References

External links
 SITI Company

Postmodern theatre
Theatre companies in New York (state)
Theatre companies in New York City